Pavol Jurčo (born 12 February 1986) is a Slovak football striker who currently plays for Czech club MFK Karviná.

Club career
Made a guest appearance for Shamrock Rovers in a friendly against Newcastle on 11 July 2009 at Tallaght Stadium.

MŠK Žilina
On 9 February 2014, MFK Zemplín Michalovce sold Jurčo to MŠK Žilina for 60 thousand euros.

Career statistics

Last update at 19 June 2009

References

External links
Corgoň Liga profile

Eurofotbal profile
MFK Košice profile

1986 births
Living people
People from Levoča
Sportspeople from the Prešov Region
Association football forwards
Slovak footballers
MFK Ružomberok players
FC Steel Trans Ličartovce players
FC VSS Košice players
1. FC Tatran Prešov players
FK Viktoria Žižkov players
MFK Zemplín Michalovce players
FK Dukla Banská Bystrica players
MŠK Žilina players
FC DAC 1904 Dunajská Streda players
Slovak Super Liga players
Czech First League players
Slovak expatriate footballers
Slovak expatriate sportspeople in Austria
Expatriate footballers in the Czech Republic
Shamrock Rovers F.C. guest players